Casas may refer to:

People
Casas (surname)

Places

Argentina 
 Casas, locality in Santa Fe Province

Mexico 
 Casas Municipality, Tamaulipas
 Casas Grandes, prehistoric archaeological site in Chihuahua
 Casas Grandes, Chihuahua
 Casas Grandes Municipality
 Nuevo Casas Grandes, Chihuahua
 Nuevo Casas Grandes Municipality

Spain

Andalusia 
 Benalup-Casas Viejas, municipality in the province of Cádiz
 Casas Bajas, locality in the Province of Granada

Castilla-La Mancha 
 Casas de Juan Núñez, municipality in the province of Albacete
 Casas de Lázaro, municipality in the province of Albacete
 Casas de Ves, municipality in the province of Albacete
 Casas-Ibáñez, municipality in the province of Albacete
 Casas de Benítez, municipality in the province of Cuenca
 Casas de Fernando Alonso, municipality in the province of Cuenca
 Casas de Garcimolina, municipality in the province of Cuenca
 Casas de Guijarro, municipality in the province of Cuenca
 Casas de Haro, municipality in the province of Cuenca
 Casas de los Pinos, municipality in the province of Cuenca

Extremadura 
 Casas de Don Antonio, municipality in the province of Cáceres
 Casas de Don Gómez, municipality in the province of Cáceres
 Casas de Millán, municipality in the province of Cáceres
 Casas de Miravete, municipality in the province of Cáceres
 Casas del Castañar, municipality in the province of Cáceres
 Casas del Monte, municipality in the province of Cáceres
 Casas de Belvís, locality and former municipality in the Province of Cáceres
 Casas de Don Pedro, municipality in the province of Badajoz
 Casas de Reina, municipality in the province of Badajoz

United States 
 Casas, Texas, a census-designated place in Starr County
 Casas Adobes, New Mexico, an unincorporated community and census-designated place in Grant County

Other
 Casas, a synonym for the moth genus Coleophora
 Casas Bahia, a Brazilian retail chain specializing in furniture and home appliances
 Casas GEO, a defunct Mexican housing development company

See also
 Las Casas (disambiguation)